Admiral Bhaskar Sadashiv Soman (30 March 1913 – 8 February 1995) was an Indian Navy Admiral. He was in command of the Indian Navy from 1962 to 1966 as the 5th Chief of the Naval Staff (CNS).

Early life
Soman was born in Gwalior, the capital of the eponymous princely state. He received his early education at the Indian National Congress' Tilak Vidyalaya and at a school in Sangli State.

Career
He subsequently entered the Royal Indian Marine (RIM), and following initial training on the training ship T/S Dufferin, was selected for officer training in the United Kingdom in 1932. He was appointed a sub-lieutenant in the RIM on 1 September 1934, and was promoted to lieutenant on 1 September 1937. During World War II, Soman was promoted to acting lieutenant-commander on 29 April 1944, and to the permanent rank of lieutenant-commander on 1 September 1945. During the war, he served in various shore establishments and in the service's Landing Craft Wing.

Soman was promoted to the acting rank of Commander in 1946 and was appointed Drafting Commander of the RIN, becoming the first Indian appointee to the post. He was promoted to acting captain on 21 July 1947. He was subsequently appointed Chief of Personnel, followed by appointment as Chief of Administration (COA) at  Naval HQ. On 5 October 1949, he relinquished office, handing over to Captain S. G. Karmarkar and took over as Senior Officer, RIN Frigate Flotilla, commanding HMIS Jumna. He received promotion to the substantive rank of Captain on 31 December 1950. In 1952, he was appointed the first Indian Naval Officer-in-Charge (NOIC), Vishakapatnam, which oversaw the Boys' Training Establishment. In January 1954, he was appointed Commodore-in-Charge, Cochin (COMCHIN), with appointment as Commodore-in-Charge, Bombay, towards the end of 1956.

Flag Rank
With the upgrading of the post, he was promoted to Rear Admiral on 12 June 1958 and reappointed as Flag Officer Commanding Bombay (FOB). In April 1960, he took over as Flag Officer Commanding Indian Fleet (FOCIF), and was in charge of India's naval operations during the 1961 Liberation of Goa.

He was appointed CNS on 5 June 1962 taking over from Vice Admiral Ram Dass Katari, with the acting rank of Vice Admiral, and was confirmed in the substantive rank on 22 November.

Post-retirement
Soman retired from the Indian Navy on 22 November 1966, relinquishing the post of CNS as a Vice Admiral, then the highest attainable rank in the Navy. In 1968, the post of CNS was upgraded to the rank of full admiral, and on 21 October 1980, Soman and Ram Dass Katari, his predecessor as CNS, were promoted to the honorary rank of full Admiral on the retired list by President Neelam Sanjiva Reddy. Soman suffered a mild stroke in December 1994. In February 1995, he suffered a more serious stroke which led to his death at the age of 81.

References 

Chiefs of the Naval Staff (India)
Indian Navy admirals
Flag Officers Commanding Indian Fleet
Chiefs of Personnel (India)
1913 births
1995 deaths
Royal Indian Navy officers
Admirals of the Indo-Pakistani War of 1965
People from Gwalior